Frederick Edward Valentine (1909–1981) was an English professional footballer who played as an outside forward for Oldham Athletic.

References

1909 births
1981 deaths
Sportspeople from Birkenhead
English footballers
Association football forwards
Runcorn F.C. Halton players
Hyde United F.C. players
Oldham Athletic A.F.C. players
English Football League players